George Henry Tribe (1828 – 19 March 1877) was a 19th-century Member of Parliament in Westland, New Zealand.

He lived in Christchurch and bought its first evening newspaper, the Evening Mail. After the paper's failure, he moved to the West Coast.

He represented the Totara electorate from 1871 to 1877, when he died.

References

1828 births
1877 deaths
Members of the New Zealand House of Representatives
New Zealand editors
New Zealand magazine editors
New Zealand MPs for South Island electorates
19th-century New Zealand politicians